Viktor Deputatov (born May 10, 1961) is a former field hockey player from the Soviet Union, who won the bronze medal with his national team at the boycotted 1980 Summer Olympics in Moscow. He also competed at the 1988 Summer Olympics in Seoul.

References
 databaseOlympics

External links
 

1961 births
Living people
Russian male field hockey players
Olympic field hockey players of the Soviet Union
Olympic field hockey players of the Unified Team
Soviet male field hockey players
Field hockey players at the 1980 Summer Olympics
Field hockey players at the 1988 Summer Olympics
Field hockey players at the 1992 Summer Olympics
Olympic bronze medalists for the Soviet Union
Olympic medalists in field hockey
Honoured Masters of Sport of the USSR
Medalists at the 1980 Summer Olympics
1990 Men's Hockey World Cup players